is a 1940 black-and-white Japanese, war film produced and directed by Yutaka Abe, with special effects by Eiji Tsuburaya. The theme song was sung by Ichiro Fujiyama and composed by Kosaku Yamada.

Cast

Heihachiro "Henry" Okawa
Katsuhiko Haida
Soji Kiyokawa

Kazuo Hasegawa

Crew
Special effects by Eiji Tsuburaya.
Art Director: Takeo Kita
Lighting: Tsuruzo Nishikawa
Sound: Isamu Suzuki

References

External links

1940s war films
Japanese war films
Toho films
Japanese black-and-white films
1940 films
Films directed by Yutaka Abe
Films scored by Fumio Hayasaka